Arnesta Joe Gaines (born November 22, 1936 at Bryan, Texas) is an American retired professional baseball outfielder. He spent all or parts of seven seasons (1960–66) in Major League Baseball as a member of the Cincinnati Reds, Baltimore Orioles and Houston Colt .45s/Astros.

After receiving brief trails with the 1960 and 1961 Reds, he made the team's 25-man roster in 1962, batting .231 in 60 games played as a reserve outfielder, then was traded to Baltimore that December.

In 1963, Gaines occasionally spelled left-handed-hitting Boog Powell as the Orioles' left fielder and batted an MLB career-high .286. He took over as the Colt .45s' regular right fielder, playing 89 games and batting .254. The 1965 season saw Gaines lose his regular job to Rusty Staub and he reverted to a backup role; although he appeared in 100 games, he batted only .227. Apart from a brief stint with 1966 Astros, when he garnered only one hit in 13 at bats, Gaines spent the final three seasons of his playing career in the Triple-A Pacific Coast League. He retired after the 1968 season.

Overall, Gaines hit .241 with 21 home runs and 95 RBI in 362 Major League games, and batted .298 with 76 homers in 949 minor-league appearances.

References

External links

1936 births
Living people
20th-century African-American sportspeople
21st-century African-American people
African-American baseball players
American expatriate baseball players in Japan
Baltimore Orioles players
Baseball players from Oakland, California
Baseball players from Texas
Cincinnati Reds players
Columbia Reds players
Denver Bears players
Hawaii Islanders players
Houston Astros players
Houston Colt .45s players
Indianapolis Indians players
Major League Baseball outfielders
Oklahoma City 89ers players
Portland Beavers players
Savannah Redlegs players
Vancouver Mounties players
Visalia Redlegs players
Wausau Lumberjacks players